Mount Bullion (also, Bulliona, Bullona, Bullionae, and Bullion) is a former mining town in Alpine County, California. It was located at the confluence of the Carson River and Monitor Creek, at an elevation of 5712 feet (1741 m).

References

External links

Former settlements in Alpine County, California
Former populated places in California